North Bromsgrove High School is a coeducational upper school and sixth form located in the centre of Bromsgrove, Worcestershire, England.

History

Grammar school
The school dates back to the co-educational grammar school Bromsgrove County High School.

Comprehensive
It became comprehensive in 1970, when the grammar school took those at the secondary modern schools of Catshill, Parkside, and Watt Close. The school was rebuilt in 2007 at the same time as it was designated as a specialist Media Arts College.

Curriculum
It offers education for GCSE and A level courses. It accepts students aged 13 to 18 (Years 9-13) from middle schools in the local area and beyond. Nick Gibson was appointed Headteacher in 2019.

Facilities and key information
North Bromsgrove High School was rebuilt in 2007 as a PFI project ensuring a high standard of construction and annual maintenance. Its facilities management is currently led by BAM. It has five acres of playing fields, a sports hall, gym, dance studio, an Apple Mac suite, drama studio, equipment to deliver music technology, a radio station, and well-equipped science laboratories. The creative suite has two food rooms, two well-equipped design and technology rooms for the delivery of engineering and product design, a textiles room and three art and photography rooms. The area houses a specialist kiln and light room to support the curriculum with two technicians across the faculty.

The school has five computer suites to deliver Business Studies, Marketing and Enterprise, Computing, Film Studies, Media Studies, Health and Criminology. They are supported by an in-house IT technical support team. The school has a modern foreign languages department that offer French and Spanish.

It has a house system made up of four houses voted for by students: Churchill, Attenborough, Rowling and Earhart all of which align with the school's pastoral system of Community, Aspiration, Respect and Endeavour.

The school also has a specialist mainstream autism base for 10 children that are allocated by the Local Authority from across Worcestershire and a large sixth-form accommodation which offers both traditional A Levels and Level 3 qualifications. It has a history of students achieving places at Oxbridge each year.

Reflecting the school's motto Studies Determine Character, North Bromsgrove has an established range of extra-curricular activities including the Duke of Edinburgh Award and has had many successes across Worcestershire in Young Enterprise and debating competitions; it also has a strong record of performing arts and sporting excellence. The school supports the local community through fundraising for charities such as New Starts and Primrose Hospice. It produced a film for the local community over Christmas 2020 celebrating local heroes. It is represented on social media and has its own YouTube account.

The new school was opened officially by an ex-pupil, the actor Mark Williams. He established an award in the name of former teacher Alan Holden and this is presented annually to the student who has shown the most dedication and commitment to the performing arts.

Catchment
The school's main feeder schools are Parkside Middle School and Catshill Middle School. Students also come from Alvechurch Middle School, Aston Fields Middle School and St John's Middle School as well as other middle schools in the surrounding areas of Redditch and Droitwich.

A significant number of students stay on into the school's successful Sixth Form, which was judged 'Good' by Ofsted in 2019 and applications are accepted from students attending other schools as well.

Notable alumni
 Stacey Francis, England netball player
 Rufus Norris, British theatre director
 Kevin Poole, footballer
 Lauren Rowles MBE, Paralympian gold medallist
 Alison Tedstone, chief nutritionist at Public Health England 
 Chris Trenfield, principal dancer with the Matthew Bourne company
 Mark Williams, The Fast Show, Harry Potter, and many other film appearances
 Sarah Leamy, MFA, author, cartoonist & photographer

Bromsgrove County High School
 John Ford CBE, Chief Executive from 1993-94 of the Driving Standards Agency, and from 1995-2000 of the Driver and Vehicle Licensing Agency (DVLA)
 Sir Fred Holliday CBE, Vice-Chancellor from 1980-90 of Durham University, chairman from 1993-2006 of Northumbrian Water, and Professor of Zoology from 1975–79 and Professor of Biology from 1967-75 at the University of Aberdeen, President from 1979-85 of the Scottish Marine Biological Association, President from 1995-2001 of the Freshwater Biological Association, Chairman from 1977-80 of the Nature Conservancy Council
 David Penny CBE FREng, President from 1981-82 of the Institution of Mechanical Engineers (IMechE), Director from 1967-69 of the National Engineering Laboratory
 Trudie Styler, actress and producer

Catshill Secondary Modern School
 Derek White, High Commissioner to Kiribati from 1990–93, and Ambassador to the Federated States of Micronesia and Marshall Islands from 1992–93

Notable teaching staff
 David Rudkin, playwright
 Clifford T. Ward, singer/songwriter

References

External links

  North Bromsgrove High School Website
 Ofsted
 North Bromsgrove High School YouTube Channel
Bromsgrove Standard North articles

Upper schools in Worcestershire
Bromsgrove
Community schools in Worcestershire